Vincenzo Di Bella (born 23 March 1977) is an Italian rally driver born in Milan. FIA Alternative Energies Cup runner-up in 2007, 2008 and 2010.

Championships
He was the Italian champion in 2010, in team with his co-driver Christian Collovà.

References

See also
FIA Alternative Energies Cup
Massimo Liverani
Guido Guerrini (traveler)
Raymond Durand (driver)

FIA E-Rally Regularity Cup drivers
Living people
Italian rally drivers
1977 births